Ziveh or Zeyveh or Zivah may refer to:
 Ziveh, Germi, Ardabil Province
 Ziveh, Kermanshah
 Ziveh, Kurdistan
 Ziveh, Qorveh, Kurdistan Province
 Ziveh, Saqqez, Kurdistan Province
 Ziveh, Khoy, West Azerbaijan Province
 Ziveh, Mahabad, West Azerbaijan Province
 Ziveh, Piranshahr, West Azerbaijan Province
 Ziveh-ye Qureh, Piranshahr County, West Azerbaijan Province
 Ziveh Jik, Salmas County, West Azerbaijan Province
 Ziveh, Gavork-e Nalin, Sardasht County, West Azerbaijan Province
 Ziveh, Melkari, Sardasht County, West Azerbaijan Province
 Ziveh, Urmia, West Azerbaijan Province
 Ziveh, Silvaneh, Urmia County, West Azerbaijan Province
 Shahrak-e Ziveh, Urmia County, West Azerbaijan Province

See also
 Ziviyeh (disambiguation)